Krasimir Koev (born 27 August 1963) is a former Bulgarian footballer who played as a defender. He spent the most of his career at Levski Sofia, winning several domestic trophies. Koev was capped 15 times at senior level for Bulgaria.

Honours

Club
Levski Sofia
 Bulgarian A Group (4): 1983–84, 1984–85, 1987–88, 1992–93
 Bulgarian Cup (4): 1981–82, 1983–84, 1985–86, 1991–92

References

External links
 
 Profile at Lportala.net

1963 births
Living people
Bulgarian footballers
Association football defenders
PFC Levski Sofia players
PFC Slavia Sofia players
PFC Lokomotiv Plovdiv players
PFC Cherno More Varna players
FC Septemvri Sofia players
First Professional Football League (Bulgaria) players
Footballers from Sofia
Bulgaria international footballers